Lucky is a made-for-television animated film produced by Nickelodeon Animation Studio. An original Nickelodeon film, it features the voices of Mark Hamill, Kira Kosarin, Ron Funches, Flula Borg, and Gunnar Sizemore. The film follows an unlucky leprechaun who goes on a quest with his three best friends, Shannon, Sammy, and Reggie, to retrieve the pot of gold stolen from his family in order to restore their luck.

It premiered on Nickelodeon on March 8, 2019.

Plot

An accident-prone leprechaun recruits the help of his best friends for an adventure to retrieve his family's stolen pot of gold from Houlihan (Mark Hamill) in order to restore peaceful luck to his family.

Voice cast
 Gunnar Sizemore as Hap
 Kira Kosarin as Shannon
 Ron Funches as Sammy
 Flula Borg as Reggie
 Mark Hamill as Houlihan
 Piotr Michael as the narrator

Production
Director Casey Leonard had no prior experience in working on computer animation and films, but joined the production after co-writer David Steinberg presented him with the film's original draft, to which he "fell in love with [...the] story". He summed the film as a mix of "comedy[...] heist, and[...] all action." "It’s really fun! At its core, Lucky is about friendship. All the luck in the world’s got nothing on love," said Leonard. He also mentioned that the film was "challenging" and "exciting". The film took about 14 months to develop.

Production services including storyboarding and rigging at Nickelodeon Animation Studio, with 30 crew members involved. Animation services were done at Bardel Entertainment for four months, with 25 animators involved.

Awards and nominations

References

External links
 

2019 television films
2010s American animated films
2019 computer-animated films
2019 films
Nickelodeon animated films
Nickelodeon original films
Films about curses
2010s English-language films